Frederick Tansley Munnings (1875, Lowestoft – 1953) was a 20th-century British spiritualist medium and former burglar. He was exposed as a fraud.

Career

Munnings lived in Hastings and worked as a boarding-house keeper. He was convicted of burglary for housebreaking at Woking and was sentenced to nine months' imprisonment. Munnings claimed to be a "direct voice" medium, but was exposed as a fraud when one of his séance sitters turned the lights on, revealing him to be holding a trumpet by means of a telescopic extension piece and using an angle piece to change the auditory effect of his voice.

In February 1926 a public warning against Munnings was issued in the press by Arthur Conan Doyle, Abraham Wallace, R. H. Saunders, and H. D. Bradley. The psychical researcher Harry Price also exposed his fraudulent mediumship. Munnings claimed to produce the independent "spirit" voices of Julius Caesar, Dan Leno, Hawley Harvey Crippen and King Henry VIII. Price invented and used a piece of apparatus known as a voice control recorder and proved that all the voices were those of Munnings. Munnings admitted fraud and sold his confessions to a Sunday newspaper.

Munnings's daughter Hilda Tansley Munnings became a noted ballerina under the name Lydia Sokolova.

References

External links 
'Astonishing Confessions of a "Bogus Spirit" Medium' Munnings's confession published in the Milwaukee Sentinel, July 28, 1928
Anonymous. (1925). The Cases of Mr. Moss and Mr. Munnings Journal of the Society for Psychical Research 22: 71–75.

1875 births
1953 deaths
English spiritual mediums
British people convicted of burglary
People from Hastings